The Coronation of the Virgin is a painting by Diego Velázquez of the Holy Trinity crowning the Blessed Virgin Mary, a theme in Marian art. It is now at the Museo del Prado.

It was probably commissioned for the oratory of the court of Elisabeth of France, queen consort to Philip IV of Spain, in the Real Alcázar of Madrid. There it joined others on Marian religious festivities by the Naples painter Andrea Vaccaro which had been brought to Madrid by cardinal Gaspar de Borja y Velasco. The model for Mary in the work may be the same model as the artist used for the Rokeby Venus.

Description 
Velázquez's coronation of the Virgin is exceptional for being a rare religious work by an artist better known for his portraits, and for the air of naturalness and simplicity not found in works by other Baroque religious painters. Its composition is based on an inverted triangle, giving a sense of great equilibrium and harmonious lines and reminiscent (both in its colour and form) of a heart. The main figure is the Virgin Mary, with a modest, reverential, and emotional expression, lowered eyes, a straight nose and curved lips. The sense that the inverted triangle is meant to refer to a heart is reinforced and the viewer's piety invoked by Mary pointing to her own heart.

To the viewer's right is God the Father, represented as a dignified old man, whilst to the left is the long-haired figure of Jesus Christ - together they hold Mary's crown above her head. In the centre the Holy Spirit is represented in the form of a white dove. The two figures' heads and the dove are all level, on the line of the triangle's base, representing their equality within the Holy Trinity. Also notable are the cherubs round the Virgin at the base of the painting - their pictorial quality rivals that of Murillo, famous for his cherub-themed works.

The colours Velázquez uses are blues and violets. He also used carmines (especially Venetian carmine) instead of traditional reds, following the advice of his tutor Pacheco as written down in his book Arte de la Pintura, despite Velázquez already being an acclaimed artist and well beyond his student years by the time of producing this painting.

External links
Velázquez , exhibition catalog from The Metropolitan Museum of Art (fully available online as PDF), which contains material on this painting (see index)

Paintings by Diego Velázquez in the Museo del Prado
1644 paintings
Velázquez
Religious paintings by Diego Velázquez
Birds in art